Pitcairnia elongata is a plant species in the genus Pitcairnia. This species is native to Ecuador.

References

elongata
Flora of Ecuador